DJ Chus (born Jesús López Esteban, 1971 in Madrid, Spain) is an electronic music producer, remixer and DJ. He works mainly in house music.

Biography
Chus began DJing at the age of 16. In 1994, he opened Teatro Kapital, and was also one of the residents in Algarve's Kadoc disco.

After years of producing house and trance music under a variety of names, DJ Chus, along with fellow DJ and producer Pablo Ceballos and manager Carlos Caliço, founded the Stereo Productions record label in 2001. DJ Chus usually collaborates with Pablo Ceballos on progressive house releases, and with David Penn on garage house tracks.

Discography

Singles

DJ Chus
1994: "Kapital Of House"
1996: "Come Into The House"
1997: "Get Funky", with David Penn and Beto Cerutti
2005: "World Routes"
2006: "Black Rain"

Chus & Ceballos
 All are collaborations with Pablo Ceballos
2001: "Afrika"
2002: "Iberican Grooves Vol. 1"
2002: "Deep Architecture", as Dano, Chus & Ceballos, with Dano
2002: "Iberican Sound"
2002: "The Strong Rhythm", as Manaça, Chus & Ceballos, with Carlos Manaça
2002: "On The Strength", as Chus & Ceballos vs. Tony Hewitt, with Tony Hewitt
2003: "Echoes From Doruma"
2004: "In Stereo", as Chus & Ceballos vs. Tedd Patterson, with Tedd Patterson
2004: "Low Frequencies", as Chus & Ceballos vs. Richie Santana, with Richie Santana
2005: "Iberican Sound (2005 Remixes)"
2005: "Wrong About Me", with Derek Conyer
2009: "Blended Sound 002: (Part 1)"
2010: "One Night In Havana" with Gonzalez & Gonzalo
2013: "Xango" with Rafa Barrios
2014: "La Colombiana"
2015: "They Say Nothing"
2015: "Black Rock City"
2015: "Abisinia" with Leonardo Gonelli ft GiGi
2015: "Check Tech" with Rafa Barrios
2016: "Twisted Comes" with Adrian Hour
2016: "Pussy Cat" with Tini Garcia
2017: "Now or Never" with Rafa Barrios Ft. Cari Golden 
2018: "Fiezzta" EP with Oscar L
2018: "More I Want U"
2018: "Down For It" with Danny Serrano, Solo Tamas
2018: "Sostenido", with Oscar L
2018: "The Sun", with Dennis Cruz

DJ Chus & David Penn/Chus+Penn
 All are collaborations with David Penn
2000: "Sunshine", with Darren J. Bell
2001: "From Madrid With Love"
2001: "Music For Playgrounds", as Halo, Penn & Chus, with Halo
2002: "Baila", with Caterina de Jesus
2002: "Burning Paris"
2004: "Esperanza"
2004: "Sunshine 2004", with Darren J. Bell
2004: "Will I (Discover Love)", with Concha Buika

Hannu
2003: "Latina"
2004: "Into The Night"
2004: "Summerfunk"

Polaris
 All are collaborations with Beto Cerutti
1997: "Polaris"
1998: "The Next Millennium"
2000: "Give Me Your Hand"

Latin Lovers
 All are collaborations with Beto Cerutti
2000: "Voices Of Savanna"
2003: "Dos Gardenias (Para Ti)"
2004: "Cuando El Amor"

Other aliases
1997: "Screaming Dolphins", as Kenya, with Beto Cerutti
1997: "Le Plaisir", as Nitro, with Beto Cerutti
1998: "Atmosphere", as Nitro, with Beto Cerutti
1998: "Are You Ready To Honk The Airhorns?", as Roundheadz, with Beto Cerutti
1998: "Bahia's Children", as Cerutti & Lopez, with Beto Cerutti
2001: "El Amor", as Joeski & Chus, with Joeski and Caterina de Jesus
2001: "The Roma EP", as DJ Chus vs. Oscar de Rivera, with Oscar de Rivera
2002: "That Feeling", as The Groove Foundation, with Pablo Ceballos and Darren J. Bell - UK #65
2003: "We Play House", as Soulground, with David Penn and Concha Buika
2005: "That Feeling (Bring It Back Again)", as The Groove Foundation, with Pablo Ceballos and Darren J. Bell
2006: "We Play House (Remixes)", as Soulground, with David Penn and Concha Buika
2006: "Superflyin'", as Cubic, with Pablo Ceballos and Victor Calderone

(Co-)productions for other artists
1995: Kadoc - "The Nighttrain"
1995: Kadoc - "The Return Of The Dark Mask EP"
2000: Tekknova - "Dancing in Outer Space", with David Castellano
2003: Marcelo Castelli - "Quimera", with Pablo Ceballos

Awards
Deejay Mags - Best House DJ 2001, 2004
Deejay Mags - Best Spanish DJ 2004
Deejay Mags - Best House Production 2002
Dance Club Awards - Best Producer 2002, 2004
Dance Club Awards - Best CD Compilation 2003

References

External links
DJ Chus Official Site

Stereo Productions Official Site

Spanish DJs
1971 births
Living people
Remixers
House musicians
House DJs
Club DJs
Spanish house musicians
Electronic dance music DJs